Albert Silvain Jules Van Den Abeele (born 18 March 1907, date of death unknown) was a Belgian sailor. He competed in the O-Jolle event at the 1936 Summer Olympics.

References

External links
 
 

1907 births
Year of death missing
Belgian male sailors (sport)
Olympic sailors of Belgium
Sailors at the 1936 Summer Olympics – O-Jolle
Sportspeople from Ghent